Kin Shein (born 10 February  1980) is a Burmese politician who currently serves as a House of Nationalities member of parliament for Tanintharyi No. 9 constituency  . He is a member of National League for Democracy.

Political career
Kin was elected as an Amyotha Hluttaw MP, winning a majority of votes 37,271 from Tanintharyi Region No.9 parliamentary constituency.

He also serves as a member of  Amyotha Hluttaw Citizens' Fundamental Rights, the Democracy and Human Rights Committee.

References

National League for Democracy politicians
1980 births
Living people
People from Tanintharyi Region